Parastenolechia asymmetrica is a moth of the family Gelechiidae. It is found in Taiwan and Korea.

References

Moths described in 1985
Parastenolechia